Martti Jarkko (born November 26, 1953 in Tampere, Finland) is a Finnish retired professional ice hockey player who played in the SM-liiga. He played for Tappara and TPS in Finland and Iserlohner EC in Germany. He was inducted into the Finnish Hockey Hall of Fame in 1993.

Career statistics

External links
 
 Finnish Hockey Hall of Fame bio

1953 births
Living people
ECD Iserlohn players
ECD Sauderland players
Finnish ice hockey forwards
HC TPS players
Tappara players
Ice hockey people from Tampere